Curve Games Limited (formerly Curve Digital Limited and Curve Studios Limited) is a British video game publisher based in London, founded in 2005 by Jason Perkins.

History 
In 2013, Curve Digital announced that they would begin publishing games as well as developing them. During the porting of Stealth Bastard to PlayStation 3 and Vita, Curve Studios asked fans to rename the game for them in order to remove the profanity, choosing Stealth Inc: A Clone in the Dark as the new title.

In August 2013 Curve announced an upcoming project titled White Space.

In January 2016, Curve Digital was acquired by Catalis Group. Catalis was then sold to NorthEdge Capital in October 2019.

The company rebranded itself to Curve Games in October 2021 as part of their commitment to better support developers.

Games developed

Games published

References

External links 
 

2005 establishments in England
Companies based in the London Borough of Islington
British companies established in 2005
Video game companies established in 2005
Video game companies of the United Kingdom
Video game development companies
Video game publishers
2016 mergers and acquisitions